Morkillia is a genus of flowering plants belonging to the family Zygophyllaceae.

It is native to Mexico.

The genus name of Morkillia is in honour of William Lucius Morkill (1858–1936), general manager of the Mexican national railroad. 
It was first described and published in Smithsonian Misc. Collect. Vol.50 on page 33 in 1907.

Known species, according to Kew:
Morkillia acuminata 
Morkillia mexicana

References

Zygophyllaceae
Rosid genera
Plants described in 1907
Flora of Mexico